Stephen Charles Mott (b. April 9, 1940) is a teacher among Evangelical Christians in the U.S. in the teaching and academic study of social ethics since the early 1970s.

Education 
He has a BD degree from Wheaton College, Illinois, and a Ph.D. degree from Harvard University, where he studied under New Testament scholar Krister Stendahl and social ethicist James Luther Adams.

Professional career 
He is an ordained minister in the United Methodist Church and served as Professor of Christian Social Ethics at Gordon-Conwell Theological Seminary in South Hamilton, Massachusetts for almost a quarter century. When he started teaching in the early 1970s, the courses he offered at Gordon-Conwell were unique across all evangelical theological schools in any English-speaking countries at the time. These courses included The Social Stance of Jesus and Biblical Social Ethics.

In 1995 he left his teaching position and became pastor of Cochesett United Methodist Church in West Bridgewater, Massachusetts, from which he retired in summer 2005. Since his retirement, he is serving part-time as a volunteer with the Essex County Community Organization and is on the Leadership Team of Christians Supporting Community Organizing, president of the James Luther Adams Foundation, and on the Board of Directors of North Shore Community Action Programs.

Books 
His most notable books are Biblical Ethics and Social Change (Oxford University Press, rev. ed. 2011 [1982]) and A Christian Perspective on Political Thought (Oxford University Press, 1993).

References

1940 births
Living people
Methodists from Massachusetts
American theologians
American evangelicals
Harvard Divinity School alumni
People from West Bridgewater, Massachusetts
Wheaton College (Illinois) alumni
American male writers
American United Methodist clergy
20th-century Methodist ministers
21st-century Methodist ministers